Tsibar is a  of the Bulgarian Navy. The ship was formerly Myosotis (M922) of the Belgian Naval Component. Myosotis keel was laid on 6 July 1987 at Ostend yard of Beliard-Murdoch. She was launched on 4 August 1988 and completed on 14 December 1989. Myosotis was stricken from the Belgian Naval Component in 2004 and sold to Bulgaria.

References 

 

Tripartite-class minehunters of the Belgian Navy
Ships built in Belgium
1988 ships
Tripartite-class minehunters of the Bulgarian Navy
Minehunters of Bulgaria